South Park is an American animated television series created by Trey Parker and Matt Stone for the Comedy Central television network. The ongoing narrative revolves around four children, Stan Marsh, Eric Cartman, Kyle Broflovski, Kenny McCormick, and their bizarre adventures in and around the fictional and eponymous Colorado town.  The town is also home to an assortment of characters who make frequent appearances in the show such as students and their family members, elementary school staff, and recurring characters.

Stan is portrayed as the everyman of the group, as the show's official website describes him as "a normal, average, American, mixed-up kid". Kyle is the lone Jew among the group, and his portrayal in this role is often dealt with satirically. Stan and Kyle are best friends, and their relationship, which is intended to reflect the real-life friendship between South Park creators Trey Parker and Matt Stone, is a common topic throughout the series. Cartman—loud, obnoxious, and obese—is sometimes portrayed as the series' antihero and whose anti-Semitic attitude has resulted in an ever-progressing rivalry with Kyle. Kenny, who comes from a poor family, wears his parka hood so tightly that it covers most of his face and muffles his speech. During the show's first five seasons, Kenny would die in almost every single episode before returning in the next without explanation.

Stone and Parker perform the voices of most of the male South Park characters. Mary Kay Bergman voiced the majority of the female characters until her death in 1999. Eliza Schneider (1999–2003), Mona Marshall (2000–present), and April Stewart (2003–present) have voiced most of the female characters since. A few staff members such as Jennifer Howell, Vernon Chatman, John Hansen, and Adrien Beard have voiced the other recurring characters.

Creation and inception

Following the success of the 1995 short Jesus vs. Santa, creators Trey Parker and Matt Stone conceived a plan to create a television series based on the short, with four children characters as the main stars. The series was originally set up at 20th Century Fox Television for its primetime premiere on FOX, which previously commissioned Parker and Stone to develop the short. However, FOX was not pleased with the show's inclusion of Mr. Hankey, a talking poo character, and felt it wouldn't bode well with viewers. The network's executives also said that placing kids as the stars could not be as funny and popular as it would with the grown-ups and families, like The Simpsons and King of the Hill.

As a result, Parker and Stone broke off relations with FOX and took the series somewhere else. They pitched the series to MTV and Comedy Central, and decided it was best suited for the latter, fearing the former could turn it to a more kid-friendly show later on. Comedy Central agreed to pick up the series, and the premiere episode, "Cartman Gets an Anal Probe", debuted on the network on August 13, 1997, while Mr. Hankey would debut in the tenth episode, "Mr. Hankey, the Christmas Poo".

In tradition with the show's cutout animation style, the characters are composed of simple geometrical shapes and uninflected patches of predominantly primary colors. They are not offered the same free range of motion associated with hand-drawn characters, as they are mostly shown from only one angle, and their movements are animated in an intentionally jerky fashion. Ever since the show's second episode, "Weight Gain 4000", all the characters on the show have been animated with computer software, though they are portrayed to give the impression that the show still utilizes the original technique of cutout animation.

Cast
Stone and Parker voice most of the male South Park characters. Mary Kay Bergman voiced the majority of the female characters until her death in 1999, near the end of the third season. Eliza Schneider and Mona Marshall succeeded Bergman in 1999, and respectively 2000, with Schneider leaving the show in 2003, after the seventh season. She was replaced by April Stewart, who, along with Marshall, continues to voice most of the female characters. Bergman was originally listed in the credits under the alias Shannen Cassidy to protect her reputation as the voice of several Disney characters. Stewart was originally credited under the name Gracie Lazar, while Schneider was sometimes credited under her rock opera performance pseudonym Blue Girl.

Some South Park staff members voice other recurring characters; supervising producer Jennifer Howell voices student Bebe Stevens, writing consultant Vernon Chatman voices an anthropomorphic towel named Towelie, and production supervisor John Hansen voices Mr. Slave, the former gay lover of Mr. Garrison. South Park producer and storyboard artist Adrien Beard, who voices Tolkien Black, the only African-American child in South Park, was recruited to voice the character "because he was the only black guy [in the] building" when Parker needed to quickly find someone to voice the character during the production of the season four (2000) episode "Cartman's Silly Hate Crime 2000".

Main characters

Stan Marsh

Stanley "Stan" Marsh is voiced by and loosely based on series co-creator Trey Parker. He first appeared in The Spirit of Christmas and is portrayed (in words of the show's official website) as "a normal, average, American, mixed-up kid". Stan is a third- then fourth-grade student who commonly has extraordinary experiences not typical of conventional small-town life in his hometown of South Park. He is also commonly portrayed as the main protagonist of the series. He is well known for the phrase "Oh my God! They killed Kenny!" which he says in many episodes whenever Kenny is subjected to painful and often gruesome deaths, and this phrase is very well known throughout popular culture. Stan has black hair, light skin, blue eyes (though color not visible due to how the series is animated), and is of average nine-year-old height. He usually wears a navy-blue beanie cap with a red trimming and a red pom-pom ball on the top of it, matching red gloves, a light-brown jacket with a matching red collar, blue jeans, and black shoes. He has his father's hair color (black) and his mother's skin tone.

Eric Cartman

Eric Cartman first appeared in the 1992 short series The Spirit of Christmas and is voiced by Trey Parker. Cartman has been portrayed as aggressive, prejudiced and emotionally unstable since his character's inception. These traits are significantly augmented in later seasons as his character evolves, and he begins to exhibit psychopathic and extremely manipulative behavior. He is depicted as highly intelligent, able to execute morally appalling plans and business ideas with success. His intelligence goes further, as Cartman is shown to be a multi-linguist, able to speak many different foreign languages fluently. Among the show's main child characters, Cartman is distinguished as "the fat kid", for which he is continuously insulted and ridiculed. Cartman is frequently portrayed as a villain whose actions set in motion the events serving as the main plot of an episode. Other children and classmates are alienated by Cartman's insensitive, racist, homophobic, anti-semitic, misogynistic, lazy, self-righteous, and wildly insecure behavior. He is also the most prejudiced character on the show.  Cartman often makes anti-semitic insults towards Kyle, constantly teases Kenny for being poor,  particularly manipulates and mistreats Butters Stotch and displays an extreme disdain for hippies. As a result, Cartman usually gets the consequences for his actions due to a flaw in his schemes or other characters proving to be smarter than him. Despite his antagonistic tendencies, he has been portrayed as a protagonist or antihero on several occasions. Cartman has short straight neatly-parted brown hair, pale skin, (no visible eye color due to how the series is animated), and extremely-fat body with neck flab and a double chin. He wears a small teal hat with a small flat yellow puff-ball on top and a matching yellow band where the forehead part of the hat begins, a large bright-red coat, matching yellow gloves, brown khaki pants, and black shoes.

Kyle Broflovski

Kyle Broflovski is voiced by and loosely based on series co-creator Matt Stone. Having appeared first in The Spirit of Christmas shorts, he often displays the highest moral standard of all the boys and is usually depicted as the most intelligent. When describing Kyle, Stone states that both he and the character are "reactionary", and susceptible to irritability and impatience. In some instances, Kyle is the only child in his class to not initially indulge in a fad or fall victim to a ploy. This has resulted in both his eagerness to fit in, and his resentment and frustration. Kyle is distinctive as one of the few Jewish children on the show, and because of this, he often feels like an outsider amongst the core group of characters. His portrayal in this role is often dealt with satirically, and has elicited both praise and criticism from Jewish viewers.
In many episodes, Kyle contemplates ethics in beliefs, moral dilemmas, and contentious issues, and will often reflect on the lessons he has attained with a speech that often begins with "You know, I learned something today...". Kyle has curly red hair, a light skin tone, (no visible eye color due to how the series is animated), and is of average nine-year-old height. He wears a bright-green ushanka hat (ear-flap hat), matching green gloves, an orange coat with a matching green collar, army green cargo pants, and black shoes.

Kenny McCormick

Kenneth "Kenny" McCormick debuted in the 1992 shorts. His oft-muffled and indiscernible speech—the result of his parka hood covering his mouth—is voiced by co-creator Matt Stone. He is friends with Stan and Kyle, while maintaining a friendship with Eric Cartman. Kenny is regularly teased for living in poverty, particularly by Cartman. Prior to Season Six, Kenny died in almost every episode, with only a few exceptions. The nature of the deaths was often gruesome and portrayed in a comically absurd fashion, and usually followed by Stan and Kyle respectively yelling "Oh my God! They killed Kenny!" and "You bastard(s)!". In the episode "Kenny Dies", Kenny dies after developing a terminal muscular disease, while Parker and Stone claimed that Kenny would not be returning in subsequent episodes and insisted they grew tired of having Kenny die in each episode. For most of season six, his place is taken by Butters Stotch and Tweek Tweak. Nevertheless, Kenny returned from the year-long absence in the season six finale "Red Sleigh Down", and has remained a starring character since, although he only appears once in Season 20. His character no longer dies each week, and has only been killed occasionally in episodes following his return. Kenny's superhero alter ego, Mysterion, first appeared in the season 13 episode "The Coon". It is revealed in the season 14 three-part story arc “Coon 2: Hindsight”, “Mysterion Rises” and “Coon vs. Coon and Friends” that Kenny canonically has an ability to resurrect after dying, though he is always the only one who can ever remember dying, despite his friends always bearing witness. It is revealed that each time he dies, Kenny's mom spontaneously gives birth to him, and then is put back in his orange parka and in bed, to regenerate overnight. This was due to his parents’ involvement in the cult of Cthulhu, whose meetings they would only attend because of the free alcohol. Kenny has bright-blond hair, a light skin color, (no visible eye color due to how the series is animated), and an average eight-year-old height. He wears a large orange parka whose large hood conceals his blond head completely with a faded-brown inside, matching faded-brown gloves, matching orange pants that match his parka, and black shoes.

Supporting characters

Butters Stotch

Voiced by Matt Stone, Butters Stotch is cheerful, naive, optimistic, sweet-natured, gullible and more passive relative to the show's other child characters. He can become increasingly anxious, especially when faced with the likelihood of his parents' punishments, which is usually being grounded, usually, for no good reason, such as when Butters threatened to "kill" himself as part of a scheme by Stan, Kyle, Kenny and Cartman, and his parents said they would "only" ground him for two weeks if he came down. Butters usually doesn't indulge in a foul-mouthed language like the other children and speaks with a mild stutter and tends to fidget with his hands. The other characters perceive him as "nerdy" and he obliviously maintains a very wholesome attitude and mild disposition despite the tragedy and abuse that he frequently encounters from both his classmates and parents. His happy-go-lucky persona has been described as resembling that of a typical 1950s sitcom child character and is usually presented in stark contrast to the harsh treatment he receives at the hands of his friends and strict parents, Butters appeared initially as a background character in first the episode, "Cartman Gets an Anal Probe", but gradually became one of Parker and Stone's favorite characters. Besides wanting to genuinely surprise fans, Parker and Stone killed Kenny at the end of season five to allow an opportunity to provide a major role for Butters, as his following episode, revolves entirely around him. Stan, Kyle, and Cartman allow him into their group as the "fourth friend", but eventually adopts his Super-villain alter ego of Professor Chaos, whom, in spite of his name, only seems to be able to screw things up that either nobody takes notice of, or can be easily resolved. Despite this, Butters has continued to be a major character in recent seasons and continues to be a frequent source of help to Cartman, while also being the main victim of Cartman's constant pranking and manipulation; in “Awesom-O”, however, Butters finally gets his revenge on Cartman by showing a videotape of him doing a Britney Spears dance routine to a life-sized cutout of Justin Timberlake to the whole town, humiliating Cartman.

Randy and Sharon Marsh

Randy and Sharon Marsh are the most prominent set of parents on the show. They are a middle-class married couple who raise their 10-year-old son Stan and 13-year-old daughter Shelly. Their first names are derived from the first names of series co-creator Trey Parker's parents, and Parker describes Randy as "the biggest dingbat in the entire show" who evolves to be one of the most heavily featured characters in the series.

Randy is 45 years old, and like Parker's father, is a geologist, making his first appearance in the series while monitoring a seismometer in the episode "Volcano". He was depicted to work at the South Park Center for Seismic Activity, and was later shown to work for the U. S. Geological Survey. He was briefly fired from his geologist job near the end of the 12th season, and quit briefly during the end of the 14th season, but has since been-rehired both times. He also serves on the city council, specializing in the town's parks and public grounds. A recurring character trait of Randy's is his being prone to overreacting and obsessively seizing upon irrational ideas and fads, whether by himself or as part of a large contingent of the town's adult population. Though the show frequently depicts him to be a moderate to heavy drinker, numerous episodes have dealt with Randy's belligerent and negligent behavior brought upon by his severe intoxication.

A few instances of personal achievement have made Randy a hero in the eyes of his friends and fellow townsfolk, such as being awarded a Nobel Prize, and twice setting a record for producing the world's largest piece of human excrement. Randy has conversely been subjected to ridicule from the entire town, ranging from when he inadvertently accelerated the effects of global warming by suggesting the entire populace take on a more uninhibited approach to passing gas in order to avoid the hazard of spontaneous combustion, to when he reluctantly exclaimed "niggers" while attempting to solve a puzzle during a live broadcast of Wheel of Fortune. In addition to the professional singing he did in his youth, Randy can also play guitar, as seen in "Guitar Queer-O". He can also speak a little Mongolian, having learned some in college, as seen in the episode "Child Abduction Is Not Funny".

The episode "Gluten Free Ebola" revealed that Randy produces music and performs as the noted musician Lorde, a fact that was explored subsequently in "The Cissy". This has become a running gag that has continued through multiple episodes, such as suggesting much of the Marsh family's income comes from his music career as Lorde rather than his geology job. As of season 22, Randy quit his job and moved the family to the countryside where he sets up Tegridy Farms to grow and distribute cannabis. For most of season 23, Randy was officially the protagonist of South Park as the show focused on his work at the Tegridy Farms instead of the town of South Park and its elementary school. Randy is also responsible for the ongoing COVID-19 pandemic after Mickey Mouse encouraged him to have sexual intercourse with a bat and a pangolin while he was sick during his trip in China ("Band in China").

Sharon is a 42-year-old receptionist. Sharon has never been portrayed in a work capacity on the series, but was depicted as the receptionist at Tom's Rhinoplasty, a local surgical clinic, in South Park: Bigger, Longer & Uncut and South Park: The Stick of Truth. She has close-cropped brown hair, and wears a brown long-sleeved pullover adorned with red ruffles at the cuffs and collar, and dark blue pants. She is referred to by the name 'Carol' in the episode 'Death' when Sheila Broflovski hands her the phone at the protest with Cartoon Central. Sharon has also been represented as an overzealous parent, such as when she kidnapped Officer Barbrady after he came to investigate the disappearance of those Sharon had buried in her yard because she mistakenly thought they were Stan's murder victims.

Herbert Garrison

Mr. Garrison was the boys’ fourth grade teacher at South Park Elementary until his dismissal, after which he mounted a campaign that resulted in his election as President of the United States. Garrison is particularly cynical, especially in comparison with the rest of South Park's adults, and he is one of the few characters to ever break the fourth wall on the show.

For the first eight seasons of the series, the character was known as Mr. Garrison.  He underwent a sex change in the season 9 premiere "Mr. Garrison's Fancy New Vagina". The character was thereafter known to the other characters as Janet Garrison or Mrs. Garrison, despite being unmarried. In the season 12 episode "Eek, a Penis!", he undergoes yet another sex change operation, returning to being a man.

Mr. Garrison was in part inspired by a kindergarten teacher who taught Trey Parker, and who used a puppet named Mr. Hat as a teaching resource.  Mr. Garrison was also inspired by a British literature professor Parker had at the University of Colorado; Parker said the voice he uses for the character is a dead-accurate impression of him. Parker said he believes Mr. Garrison has become one of the most complex characters on South Park, particularly due to his ever-growing relationship with Mr. Hat and his sexuality and gender issues; Parker said of Mr. Garrison, "He's the soap opera element to the whole series. [He] has a real story going on."

Mr. Mackey

Mr. Mackey is the school guidance counselor. He has a disproportionately large head and mumbles "m'kay" after most sentences.  He speaks with a Southern accent, and he is believed to be from Louisiana. It is assumed he is at least 40 years old (he once said he had sex at 19 and that it has been about 21 years since). He is based on Trey Parker's junior high school counselor, Stan Lackey. He has occasionally taught classes at the school, and taught sex education with Ms. Choksondik. During this time he had a sexual relationship with Ms. Choksondik until her death. After her death, he took over the fourth grade class until Mr. Garrison returned.

Despite his strange presence, Mr. Mackey is an able and responsible counselor who, much unlike other South Park Elementary faculty and staff, cares about his students. He sometimes appears with Principal Victoria when punishing a student or announcing an important message. His methods as a counselor often reflect real-life controversies in education. For example, when Kyle talks about seeing Mr. Hankey the Christmas Poo, he places Kyle on a heavy dose prescription of Prozac. In an early episode, the children feign having attention deficit disorder, and he prescribes them all Ritalin. During a drug-education class in the episode "Ike's Wee Wee", he passes some marijuana around the classroom, and it is stolen (apparently by one of the children, though it is later revealed that the actual thief was Mr. Garrison). For this, Mr. Mackey is fired by the school and evicted by his landlord, and, feeling depressed, he ends up using alcohol, marijuana and LSD. The episode suggests that his large head is caused by the tightness of his tie around his neck, but in "Child Abduction Is Not Funny", his parents are shown to have large heads as well. He becomes a hippie and travels to India with a like-minded woman. Mr. Mackey is captured by The A-Team, and his former employers, along with Jimbo, say that they should have helped him with his drug problem rather than firing him. Mr. Mackey protests, saying that he likes his new life and that he actually has not done drugs since his first experimentations back in South Park. Nobody listens and in rehab at the Betty Ford Clinic, he is "cured" of his addiction to drugs. Mr. Mackey's social worker then re-ties his tie, which makes his head swell back to its original size.

Gerald and Sheila Broflovski

Gerald and Sheila Broflovski are an upper-middle-class, Jewish married couple who raise their ten-year-old son Kyle and three-year-old Canadian son Ike. Gerald is a lawyer who also serves on South Park's council as the city attorney, and his role in this profession has been put on display in episodes such as "Sexual Harassment Panda" and "Chef Goes Nanners" in which a trial or legal issue plays a large part in the plot. He is a generally kind, amiable person, though at intervals he has been shown to assume a snobbish attitude that disaffects his friends and family. Examples include the episode "Chicken Pox" where it is revealed that he used to be close with Stuart McCormick when they were younger but that the two had a falling out due to economic differences or when he begins acting like an arrogant snob after buying a hybrid car in "Smug Alert!". In "Sexual Harassment Panda", Gerald repeatedly sued South Park Elementary (which was faultless in every case), and later every citizen of South Park, showing his shameless monetary greed and disregard for civil propriety. Gerald was once seen to have a repressed gambling problem, and prior struggles with a fictional form of inhalant abuse known within the show as "cheesing". Gerald is, in season 20 of the show, revealed to be an internet troll. His internet alias is 'Skankhunt42', and initially, everyone thinks that Eric Cartman is, in fact, Skankhunt42. When trolling, he makes provocative statements against women, and, most notably, creates images where he "puts a dick in [women's] mouths." He always drinks red wine and listens to music by Boston when trolling. His antics eventually place him in the news after trolling a Danish olympian making him of the two main antagonists of the entirety of season twenty alongside Lennart Bedrager.

Sheila made her first appearance in the season one episode "Death" (where she was originally named Carol), and she exhibits several traits commonly associated with those of a stereotypical Jewish mother. In the episode "It's a Jersey Thing", it is revealed that Sheila was originally from New Jersey, where she was known as "S-Wow Tittybang", and that she and Gerald moved to South Park to avoid having their newly conceived child grow up there. Apart from being briefly appointed to the fictional federal position of "Secretary of Offense" under the Clinton Administration, Sheila is a stay-at-home mother. In earlier seasons, Sheila often spearheaded public opposition to things she deemed harmful to children or to the Jewish community. She led a group to New York City to protest Terrance and Phillip, a Canadian comedy duo whose television show's toilet humor is what she believed to be a negative influence on Kyle. Her outrage escalated in South Park: Bigger, Longer & Uncut when she further protested Terrance and Phillip by forming "Mothers Against Canada", which eventually instigated a war between Canada and the United States making her one of the main antagonists of the film. At the climax of the film, she takes her crusade against the duo to the extreme by shooting Terrance and Phillip despite her son's protests, which fulfills an apocalyptic prophecy allowing Satan, his minions, and his ex-lover Saddam Hussein to invade Earth. This aspect has been toned down in recent years, and is more or less completely absent from newer episodes.

Liane Cartman

Liane Marie Cartman is the generally sweet-natured mother of Eric Cartman; though in later seasons, she is a more proactive mother who does not tolerate his antics or foul language. Her promiscuity, often with total strangers, was a running gag initially. It seemed as though all of the adults in South Park had slept with her (probably the women, too). Although in episode 7, she is indicated to be a "crack whore", she says in "The Poor Kid" that she has not done drugs in some time, and works "two jobs."  Liane's commuting from the home during normal daytime hours implies that at least one of the jobs is a traditional, non-prostitution form of employment, though the nature of this work is never specified.  Despite the multiple sources of income, Eric comes to believe that he and Liane are the second poorest family in South Park (at least of those whose children attend South Park Elementary) after Kenny McCormick's. At other times, it is implied that the Cartman household's IRS-reported income mostly comes from government welfare programs, that Liane has simply transformed her prostitution career into a better-organized, safer "escort"-style operation, or that in fact Liane has never held a traditional job and the family is in a more precarious economic state than their depicted lifestyle indicates.  As of Season 25, current continuity states that Liane has been unable to maintain legitimate employment due to constant demands on her time from Eric, and as a result of this economic stress combined with increases in rent on the family's house, the Cartmans are unable to keep up with their bills and find themselves living in an abandoned hot dog stand.  Eric refuses to allow Liane to work, instead of attend to him, when he is awake even when explicitly told that this will cause financial disaster for the family, a storyline which may tie in to depictions of Cartman as homeless in the future.

It is seemingly revealed in season 2 that Liane is a hermaphrodite (and so is Eric's father),  though in episode "201"  it is revealed that Eric's real father is Jack Tenorman, the father of his nemesis Scott Tenorman. Jack Tenorman was a member of the 1991 Denver Broncos, and the ruse about her being a hermaphrodite was made up to maintain the Broncos' reputation since "they were having a good year".

She was named after creator Trey Parker's ex-fiancé, Liane Adamo, whom he broke up with after he discovered that she had an affair.

Jimmy Valmer

Jimmy Valmer is one of the boys' two handicapped classmates, alongside Timmy Burch. He is physically disabled, requiring forearm crutches in order to walk. His disability has never been specified on the show but seems visually and functionally similar to cerebral palsy. In Season 7 Episode 2 "Krazy Kripples", it is made clear that both Jimmy and Timmy were born with their disabilities. In any case, hampered by his legs, which in many cases he appears not to be able to use, Jimmy primarily uses his crutches both as substitutes for his legs and sometimes even as extra (weaponized) extensions for his arms. He prefers to be called "handi-capable". Jimmy is able to speak coherently, and his various aspirations on several different levels of journalism over time also sometimes even makes him more articulate than any of the other children, though his speech is largely affected by his stuttering, and sometimes also his tendency to end some of his sentences with "...very much". He aspires to be a stand-up comedian, and is often featured performing his routines. His catchphrase during his routines is "Wow, what a terrific audience!"

Jimmy first appears in the season five (2001) episode "Cripple Fight", in which he moves to South Park from a neighboring town and antagonizes Timmy. Parker and Stone initially intended for this to be Jimmy's only appearance, but decided to include the character in subsequent episodes. Now portrayed as a South Park resident, student, and good friend of Timmy, Jimmy has been a recurring character ever since. Jimmy's parents had made fun of disabled children in high school, and believe that Jimmy's  disability is a punishment from God. The season eight (2004) episode "Up the Down Steroid" ends with Jimmy addressing the issue of anabolic steroid use in athletic competitions, declaring it as "cheating" while suggesting that professional athletes who use steroids voluntarily reject the accolades and records attributed to them. The episode also reveals that Jimmy has a girlfriend named Nancy. Jimmy is also commonly seen with Craig Tucker, Clyde Donovan, and Tolkien Black as part of "Craig's Gang". Despite his disability, he is also shown to be an extremely accomplished drummer, performing with Stan Marsh's death metal group Crimson Dawn in the episode "Band in China".

In the near future in the movie South Park: Post Covid, Jimmy has his own talk show named "Late Night with Jimmy", a'la Jimmy Kimmel Live!, and is called "the king of woke comedy".

Tolkien Black

Tolkien Black (previously Williams), voiced by Trey Parker and later Adrien Beard, first appeared in "Cartman Gets an Anal Probe". He is the only black child in South Park until the introduction of Nichole Daniels in "Cartman Finds Love" in season 16. Originally named "Token", "Token Williams", and finally "Token Black" as a play on the notion of a token black character, it is retconned in the second episode "The Big Fix" of the twenty-fifth season (2022) his first name is actually "Tolkien", after J. R. R. Tolkien. In the episode, Tolkien addresses an assembly hosted by Stan in which he states that he hates his namesake, saying that he finds J.R.R. Tolkien's work to be "a bunch of nerdy, jive-ass dragon shit". After his name was changed, Comedy Central changed the synopses and subtitles for every past episode that mentions the name "Token" to "Tolkien".

Episodes in which he plays a major role often address ethnicity-related topics. In "Here Comes the Neighborhood", he becomes self-conscious when his classmates mock him for being the wealthiest one in their class. He attempts to address this by inviting several other wealthy families to move to South Park (who all happen to be black) including Will Smith and Snoop Dogg, leading the townspeople to refer to them as "richers". When he realizes he does not fit in with his wealthy peers either, he goes to live with lions at the zoo, before he learns that his classmates mock him not because they do not like him, but because they all mock each other and because it is part of how they relate to each other.

In "Cartman's Silly Hate Crime 2000", his father declares hate crime legislation to be "a savage hypocrisy". In the season 11 (2007) episode "With Apologies to Jesse Jackson", Stan is perplexed by Tolkien’s rebuffs of his attempts to make amends with Tolkien after Stan's father reluctantly exclaimed "niggers" when attempting to solve a puzzle as a contestant during a live taping of Wheel of Fortune. When Stan has an epiphany, he tells Tolkien "I've been trying to say that I understand how you feel, but I'll never understand. I'll never really get how it feels for a black person to [hear] somebody use the N-word", to which Tolkien accepts Stan's apology by saying "Now you get it."

Wendy Testaburger

 
Wendy Testaburger is the show's most prominent female student. Her best friend is Bebe Stevens, she is the on-and-off girlfriend of Stan. She is also the other voice of reason (besides Kyle). Wendy has previously been voiced by Karri Turner (in the unaired pilot), Mary Kay Bergman, Mona Marshall, Eliza Schneider, and is currently voiced by April Stewart. Fellow co-creator Matt Stone has also cited the name of Wendy Westerberg, the wife of an old friend from his childhood. She wears a pink beret, a purple coat and yellow pants. She has long black hair with uneven bangs. Wendy made her first appearance unnamed, but clearly recognizable, in "The Spirit of Christmas".

Like her boyfriend Stan, Wendy is mature for her age, critical of popular trends, moral and intellectual, as well as being a feminist, as noted in many of her appearances. She campaigns in several episodes on causes such as breast cancer and the suffering of Bottlenose dolphins, often arguing with Eric Cartman who calls her a "bitch" or "ho" in response. Although the two generally only argue, he pushes her to the limit in the Season 12 (2008) episode "Breast Cancer Show Ever" wherein the two engage in a fight on the playground, in which Wendy badly beats up Cartman.

Wendy is known to be protective of her relationship with Stan. In the Season 1 (1997) episode "Tom's Rhinoplasty" when Stan, along with the other boys, falls in love with an attractive substitute teacher, Wendy accuses her of stealing Stan from her, and eventually formulates a complex plan to get her thrown into the sun. She also sometimes displays jealousy – in the Season 6 (2002) episode "Bebe's Boobs Destroy Society", her best friend, Bebe Stevens, receives more attention than she does because of Bebe's developing breasts. Wendy then gets breast implants, but the boys end up ridiculing her after only just realizing the control Bebe's breasts had on them. This behavior is somewhat contradicted by episodes such as "Stupid Spoiled Whore Video Playset" and "Dances with Smurfs" where she is more concerned with principles than trends and attention.

Wendy is more prominent in the show's earlier seasons, usually quarreling with Eric Cartman or reinforcing her relationship with Stan. She speaks in several episodes (especially in the first season) and is often chosen to help the boys out over her classmates. Wendy and Stan's relationship received less focus over the course of the Season 5 (2001), and she has only one minor role in Season 6 (2002). This culminates in her breakup with Stan and pairing with Tolkien Black in "Raisins", after which she makes only scattered prominent appearances until the end of the eleventh season, where she gets back together with Stan in "The List". They subsequently pair up as partners on a field trip in "Super Fun Time", she beats Cartman in a fight in "Breast Cancer Show Ever" and in the episode "Elementary School Musical" Stan suspects that she may leave him for a popular boy called Bridon. Wendy is able to kiss Stan on the cheek in "Elementary School Musical" without his previous nauseated reaction.

Wendy was voted student council president, something first noted in "Bebe's Boobs Destroy Society" and re-addressed seven seasons later in "Dances with Smurfs", when Cartman becomes the morning announcer and starts spreading defaming comments about her—most notably her supposed genocide of the Smurfs. In response to the allegations, Wendy becomes a guest on Cartman's morning show and manipulates his own story of the Smurf holocaust before announcing her resignation and electing him as the new school council president, effectively relieving him of his morning announcement job. Throughout the episode, Stan solidly defends her.

Clyde Donovan

Clyde Donovan (originally Clyde Goodman and briefly Clyde Harris), voiced by Trey Parker, maintains a friendship with the show's main characters and is among the most often-seen of the boys' extended group, playing supporting roles in several episodes. Clyde first appeared in the show's pilot episode "Cartman Gets an Anal Probe". He makes his first prominent appearance in the 1999 season 3 episode "Tweek vs. Craig" in which he tells everyone that both Tweek and Craig decided against fighting each other and went home instead. He has medium-brown hair, wears a burgundy coat, grayish-brown trousers, and sometimes wears ocean-blue mittens. In the season 4 (2000) episode "Cartman's Silly Hate Crime 2000", he is nominated as "the second fattest kid in class" besides Cartman, and is chosen to replace him in the sled race. The season 11 (2007) episode "Lice Capades" focuses heavily on Clyde and a group of anthropomorphic lice, who are portrayed as living in a civilized society on Clyde's head. Clyde was so embarrassed when a girl at the doctor's office asked what he was going in for that he said he had AIDS. 

In "The List", the girls vote him the cutest boy in class, turning him into a superficial ladies' man, though this list is later revealed to have been manipulated by political considerations. Clyde appears in the three-part story arc "Coon 2: Hindsight", "Mysterion Rises", and "Coon vs. Coon and Friends" as his alter-ego, Mosquito. He is the focus of the episode "Reverse Cowgirl", in which he causes his mother Betsy's death when he fails to put the toilet seat down in their home, causing her to fall in and have her organs ripped out by the pressure. The episode also reveals Clyde's father's name to be Roger, and that he has a sister.

Despite his friendship with the four main characters, Clyde serves as the main antagonist of the video game South Park: The Stick of Truth. He also plays a role as one of the main characters in South Park: The Fractured but Whole as his superhero alter-ego, Mosquito. who supposedly has the ability to control and has the abilities of a mosquito.

Craig Tucker

Craig Tucker, voiced by Matt Stone, commonly characterized by his blue chullo hat and deep nasal monotone voice, is one of the more prominent members of the children's classroom. Craig dislikes the four main characters and rivals them in several episodes. Craig is a pragmatist and has no wish to become involved in any extraordinary adventures the other main characters on the show customarily experience. In the first several seasons, Craig has a habit of giving people the finger, a trait the show's official website attributes to his learning the behavior from his family, all of whom frequently use the gesture as well, most notably in the third season episode, "Tweek vs. Craig", in which his entire family take turns flipping each other off at the dinner table. This trait was used less throughout the show's runtime, and was last seen in the episode "Fun with Veal". Along with the rest of the characters, Craig moved to the fourth grade in "Fourth Grade".

Despite his dislike of the main characters, particularly Cartman, he is often depicted as one of the boys who repeatedly join Cartman in his many schemes, at times serving as a right-hand man. Craig is also involved in a homosexual relationship with fellow fourth-grade student Tweek Tweak. In the Season 19 episode "Tweek x Craig", female students of Asian backgrounds started drawing homoerotic "yaoi" images of Craig and his classmate Tweek Tweak, depicting them as lovers, in contrast to their rival-like role in "Tweek vs. Craig". Immediately, the two try to repudiate the rumors about them prompted by this. They eventually resolve to stage a public "break-up" to end the rumors. Though Tweek fears he cannot do this believably, Craig encourages him that he indeed can. However, Tweek goes too far by claiming that Craig is a manipulative cheater, which has the effect of ruining Craig's reputation with girls. Tweek later reveals that Craig's encouragement gave him the confidence to believe in himself. Following the father-to-son talk between him and his father about how "you can't fight being gay", the two boys have been forced in a relationship, at the time seemingly just to appease the townspeople. In later episodes however, such as the season 21 episode "Put It Down" and the video game The Fractured But Whole, they are shown to have become sincere romantic partners and identify as gay.

Recurring characters

Reception and impact
Kyle, Cartman, Stan and Kenny have all appeared on the cover of Rolling Stone magazine.

Cartman is a South Park fan favorite, and is often described as the most iconic character from the series. With a headline to their online written version of a radio report, NPR declared Cartman as "America's Favorite Little $@#&*%". "Respect my authoritah!" and "Screw you guys ...I'm going home!" became catchphrases and, during the show's earlier seasons, were highly popular in the lexicon of viewers. His eccentric enunciation of "Hey!" was included in the 2002 edition of The Oxford Dictionary of Catchphrases. Stone has said that when fans recognize him or Parker, the fans will usually do their imitation of Cartman, or, in Parker's case, request that he do Cartman's voice. Both Cartman's commentary and the commentary resulting in response to his actions have been interpreted as statements Parker and Stone are attempting to make to the viewing public, and these opinions have been subject to much critical analysis in the media and literary world.

Cartman ranked 10th on TV Guide's 2002 list of the "Top 50 Greatest Cartoon Characters", 24th on TV Guide’s "25 Greatest TV Villains", 198th on VH1's "200 Greatest Pop Culture Icons", and 19th on Bravo's "100 Greatest TV Characters" television special in 2004. When declaring him the second-scariest character on television (behind only Mr. Burns of The Simpsons) in 2005, MSNBC's Brian Bellmont described Cartman as a "bundle of pure, unadulterated evil all wrapped up in a fat—er, big-boned—cartoony package" who "takes a feral delight in his evildoing".

While Parker and Stone portray Stan and Kyle as having common childlike tendencies, their dialogue is often intended to reflect stances and views on more adult-oriented issues, and have been subject to much critical analysis in the media and literary world and have frequently been cited in publications by experts in the fields of politics, religion, popular culture and philosophy.

Kenny's deaths are well known in popular culture, and was one of the things viewers most commonly associated with South Park during its earlier seasons. The exclamation of "Oh my God! They killed Kenny!" quickly became a popular catchphrase, while both Kenny and the phrase have appeared on some of the more popular pieces of South Park merchandise, including shirts, bumper stickers, calendars and baseball caps, and inspired the rap song "Kenny's Dead" by Master P, which was featured on Chef Aid: The South Park Album. The catchphrase also appears in MAD magazine's satire of TITANIC where Stan, Kyle and Cartman are shown on a lifeboat while they were supposedly escaping from the sinking ship. Kenny's deaths have been subject to much critical analysis in the media and literary world. When Sophie Rutschmann of the University of Strasbourg discovered a mutated gene that causes an adult fruit fly to die within two days after it is infected with certain bacteria, she named the gene "Kenny" in honor of the character.

Merchandise
The characters of the South Park franchise have spawned several merchandise items, varying from toys to apparel items. In 2004, the first action figure collection was released by Mirage Toys containing five series each with four characters. In 2006, Mezco toys released a second collection containing a total of six series, each containing six or four figures. Comedy Central itself has made available a variety of products through its website, including T-shirts, figures, hats, pants, and even shot glasses. A number of fan websites provides an even more extended amount of merchandise, ranging from posters, to magnets, ties and even skateboards, South Park Studios offer through their website the possibility of creating personalized South Park avatars. Similar possibilities have been available on multiple fan sites.

Notes

References

External links
 South Park Studios  official website
 

 01
Lists of American sitcom television characters
Lists of characters in American television adult animation